"No Creo" (I don't believe) is a song written and performed by the Colombian singer-songwriter Shakira.  The song was released as the fourth single, although initially intended to be the lead,  from her multi-platinum album Dónde Están los Ladrones? (1998) and later from her acoustic performance of the song on the MTV show Unplugged (2000). In the song, the singer expresses how she believes in nothing and nobody except her lover. The song references popular socially accepted or non-accepted norms such as herself, luck, Karl Marx, Jean-Paul Sartre, Mars and Venus, and Brian Weiss.

Music video
The video begins in a room, where Shakira jumps out of a window into a grassland where eccentric people are present.  She scratches the ceiling of a room, goes through dark rooms, riots, swims through a washing room. A brief scene of the video is played on a screen in the music video for "Ciega, Sordomuda", which sparked speculation that some scenes were shot back-to-back with "Ciega, Sordomuda". It was later confirmed that although "No Creo" was originally intended to be the first single from the album, Sony decided that "Ciega, Sordomuda" would be a better opener of the album cycle.

Formats and track listings

Pablo Flores E André Werneck remixes single
 "No Creo" (G-Vô Club Mix)6:20
 "No Creo" (Pablo Flores Club 12" Remix)9:42
 "No Creo" (Pablo Flores Radio Edit)4:44
 "No Creo" (Pablo Flores Dub Mix)7:27
 "No Creo" (LP Version)3:53

Charts

References

Spanish-language songs
Shakira songs
Songs written by Shakira
Songs written by Luis Fernando Ochoa
1998 songs
Classical mythology in music
1999 singles